Julian Baretta (born October 3, 1957)  is a Canadian former professional ice hockey player. He helped Wisconsin win their second National Title in 1977, earning Tournament MOP honors and winning the shortest overtime championship game in tournament history.

Career
Baretta moved to Madison after spending parts of two seasons playing in Canada, winning a Centennial Cup in 1975 with the Spruce Grove Mets. With head coach Bob Johnson away coaching the Olympic Team the Badgers bottomed out, finishing tied for last place in the WCHA bus still manages to make the conference tournament where they were swept out by Michigan State. When Johnson returned for 1976–77 he brought several players with him including Steve Alley and John Taft, seniors who had played on the Olympic team. The infusion of offense allowed Wisconsin to put their worst season in team history (at that point) in the rearview mirror and jump out to a great start to the season. Baretta split time in net with Mike Dibble but it was the sophomore who finished the season with a 21-2 record and a 3.08 GAA, third best in the NCAA and tops in the WCHA.

Baretta paced the Badgers as they swept through the WCHA tournament, winning all 6 of their games and posted a shutout against Michigan in the championship series. As the WCHA did not name an All-Tournament Team or Tournament MVP until 1988 Baretta has to accept only being named to the All-WCHA First Team and an All-American. As the WCHA champion, Wisconsin received the top western seed and played New Hampshire in the semifinals. The two teams played into overtime and Baretta kept everying out of the net in the extra frame, allowing Mike Eaves to score the winning goals and send Wisconsin to the title tile against Michigan. Despite twice holding 3-goal leads, Michigan battled back and scored 5 times on 39 shots to tie the championship game and sent it into overtime. Steve Alley scored on the first shot of the extra frame and gave the Badgers the 1977 National Championship. Baretta was named to the All-Tournament Team and named as Most Outstanding Player.

The next year saw the Badgers take a small step back, finishing second in the WCHA, but another superlative effort from Baretta saw Wisconsin win another WCHA tournament title and make its second consecutive NCAA tournament. Unfortunately, Wisconsin ran into an angry Boston University team and the Badgers lost both of their games. Baretta made it onto the WHCA Second Team. Baretta returned for his senior season but the Badgers weren't quite up to par and finished 4th in the WCHA. Despite this they narrowly missed making the tournament, losing to #1 seed North Dakota 11-9. After graduating Baretta played just over a season in the IHL playing for three separate teams. He left the game in 1980 but resurfaced briefly in 1984-85 with HC Auronzo but didn't play in any games.

Awards and honors

References

External links 

1957 births
Living people
AHCA Division I men's ice hockey All-Americans
American men's ice hockey goaltenders
Ice hockey players from Wisconsin
Wisconsin Badgers men's ice hockey players
Muskegon Mohawks players
Saginaw Gears players
Milwaukee Admirals players
Los Angeles Kings draft picks
Edmonton Oilers draft picks
NCAA men's ice hockey national champions